Klaus Thiele (born 21 January 1958 in Potsdam) was an East German athlete who competed mainly in the 400 metres.

He competed for East Germany in the 1980 Summer Olympics held in Moscow, Soviet Union in the 4 × 400 metres relay where he won the silver medal with his teammates Andreas Knebel, Frank Schaffer and Volker Beck.

External links
 
 
 
 

1958 births
Living people
Sportspeople from Potsdam
East German male sprinters
Olympic athletes of East Germany
Athletes (track and field) at the 1980 Summer Olympics
Olympic silver medalists for East Germany
Recipients of the Patriotic Order of Merit
Medalists at the 1980 Summer Olympics
Olympic silver medalists in athletics (track and field)